Trachypteris is a small genus of ferns in the subfamily Cheilanthoideae of the family Pteridaceae. Three species are native to the tropical South America, one (Trachypteris drakeana) to Madagascar.

Species
, the Checklist of Ferns and Lycophytes of the World recognized the following species:
Trachypteris drakeana C.Chr.
Trachypteris gilliana (Baker) Svenson
Trachypteris induta (Maxon) R.M.Tryon & A.F.Tryon
Trachypteris pinnata (Hook.f.) C.Chr.

References

Pteridaceae
Fern genera